Osladine is a high-intensity sweetener isolated from the rhizome of Polypodium vulgare. It is a saponin, sapogenin steroid glycoside, 500 times sweeter than sucrose.

A related compound, polypodoside A, has been identified from Polypodium glycyrrhiza and is 600 times sweeter than a sucrose solution at 6%.

See also 
 Sugar substitute
 Glycyrrhizin

References

External links

Sugar substitutes
Steroidal glycosides
Saponins
Ketones